Uttam Akash is a Bangladeshi film director and screenwriter. His debutante film Muktir Sangram was released in 1995.

Career
Akash made his debut in the Bangladesh film industry with Muktir Sangram which released in 1995. His most known films are Muktir Sangram (1995), Ora Dalal (2004), Mumtaz (2005), Tui Jodi Amar Hoiti Re (2006), Danob Shontan (2007, Bhalobasha Dibi Kina Bol (2012), Dhaka to Bombay (2013), Ek Jobaner Zamidar, Here Gelen Eibar (2015), Dhakaiya Pola, Borishaler Maiya (2015), Raja 420 (2015), Ami Neta Hobo (2018), and the very recent one (Chittagainga Poa, Noakhaila Maiya (2018). Akash has received and have been nominated for plenty of Bangladeshi National Film Awards for Best Director. There were other unspecified National TV Awards that Akash has won.

Filmography
 Muktir Sangram (1995)
 Ke Oporadhi (1997)
 Sabbas Bangali (1998)
 Ora Dalal (2003)
 Momtaz (2005)
 Vondo Ojha (2006)
 Tui Jodi Aamar Hoiti Re (2006)
 Danob Shontan (2007)
 Bhalobasha Dibi Kina Bol (2012)
 Dhaka to Bombay (2013)
 Ek Jobaner Zamindar, Here Gelen Eibar (2015)
 Raja 420 (2015)
 Dhakaiya Pola, Borishaler Maiya (2015)
 The father of Nation (2017)
 Ami Neta Hobo (2018)
 Chittagainga Powa Noakhailla Maiya (2018)
 Dhushor Kuasha (2018)
 Keu Kotha Rakhena (2018)
 Mamla Hamla Jhamela - 2019
 Boyfriend (2019)
 Prem Chor (2019)

References

External links
 

Living people
Bangladeshi film directors
Recipients of the National Film Awards (Bangladesh)
Bangladeshi directors
1968 births